On 21 April 2008 Eric Burdon & War reunited at the Royal Albert Hall in London. It was their first concert for 37 years.

The line-up included:

Eric Burdon - lead vocals
Lonnie Jordan - keyboards, lead vocals
Salvador Rodriguez - drums
Fernando Harkless - saxophone
Marcos Reyes - percussion
Start Ziff - lead guitar
Francisco "Pancho" Tomaselli - bass
Mitch Kashmar - harmonica

Setlist 

 "The World Is a Ghetto"
 "The Cisko Kid"
 "Why Can't We Be Friends"
 "Low Rider"
 "Spill the Wine" (Eric Burdon came in)
 "Spirit"
 "Magic Mountain"
 "The Vision of Rassan" (credited as "Rhassan Roland Kirk")
 "Tobacco Road"
 "Mother Earth"
 "Bare Back Ride"
 "Paint it Black"
 "House of the Rising Sun"
 "Don't Let Me Be Misunderstood"
 "Slippin' into Darkness"
 "Don't Let Me Be Misunderstood (Outro)"

Concerts at the Royal Albert Hall
2008 in music
2008 in London
2000s in the City of Westminster